Kumarevo may refer to:

 Kumarevo (Leskovac)
 Kumarevo (Vranje)